Paul Mills may refer to:

 Paul Mills (figure skater), Canadian former pair skater
 Paul Mills (basketball) (born 1972), American college basketball coach
 Paul Mills (rugby league), Australian rugby league player